
Year 704 (DCCIV) was a leap year starting on Tuesday (link will display the full calendar) of the Julian calendar. The denomination 704 for this year has been used since the early medieval period, when the Anno Domini calendar era became the prevalent method in Europe for naming years.

Events 
 
 By place 

 Byzantine Empire 

 After spending nearly a decade with the Khazars (a Turkic tribe which controls a Steppe empire), the deposed emperor Justinian II flees from his exile at Cherson (Crimea). He escapes with help from Busir, ruler (khagan) of the Khazars, who marries him to his sister Theodora. 
 Autumn – Emperor Tiberios III tries to bribe Busir and dispatches two Khazar officials, Papatzys and Balgitzin, to kill Justinian. Warned by his wife, he flees to the Bulgar Khanate, securing the assistance of the Bulgarian ruler Tervel, in exchange for financial considerations.
 Arab–Byzantine War: A Byzantine expeditionary force under Heraclius (brother of Tiberios III) is defeated and destroyed by an Umayyad army (10,000 men) at Sisium (modern Turkey), killing most and leading the rest off in chains to Damascus.

 Britain 
 King Æthelred I abdicates the throne after a 30-year reign and becomes an abbot at Bardney (Lincolnshire). He is succeeded by his nephew Cenred (Coenred), a son of the late king Wulfhere, who becomes ruler of Mercia. 
 December 14 – King Aldfrith of Northumbria dies after a 20-year reign. His throne is seized by Eadwulf I, of unknown descent. Wilfrid travels to Driffield to support Eadwulf, but his advances are rejected (approximate date).   

 Arabian Empire 
 Arab conquest of Armenia: The Muslim Arabs under Abdallah ibn Abd al-Malik (a son of caliph Abd al-Malik ibn Marwan) invade Armenia and subdue the anti-Arab revolt along with his uncle Muhammad ibn Marwan.
 Winter – Abdallah ibn Abd al-Malik is recalled from Armenia to serve as governor of Egypt. He requires that government business be done in Arabic instead of Coptic. His tenure is marred by famine and corruption.

 Asia 
 Emperor Tridu Songtsen dies in battle and is succeeded by his mother Khri ma lod who becomes de facto ruler of the Tibetan Empire. She begins a massive expansion into the Tarim Basin and Northern China.

Births 
 Cui Hao, Chinese poet (d. 754)
 Fujiwara no Toyonari, Japanese statesman (d. 765)
 Gao Shi, Chinese poet (approximate date)
 Hyecho, Korean Buddhist monk (d. 787)
 Ibn Ishaq, Arab historian and hagiographer 
 Li Fuguo, Chinese official (d. 762)
 Me Agtsom, emperor of Tibet (d. 755)

Deaths 
 December 14 – Aldfrith, king of Northumbria (or 705)
 Abd al-Rahman ibn Muhammad ibn al-Ash'ath, Arab rebel leader
 Adomnán, Irish abbot and hagiographer (b. c.624)
 Tridu Songtsen, emperor of Tibet (b. 670)

References